The Tom Borrelli Award is presented by the National Lacrosse League to the league's "Media Person of the Year". The award was originally awarded to the Writer of the Year, but "was changed to Media Person of the Year in 2011 to allow for a wider range of media members to be considered for the award, including broadcasters."

The award is named for Tom Borrelli (1957–2008), a writer for The Buffalo News who covered the Buffalo Bandits from the team's inception in 1992 to his death in 2008. He was inducted into the National Lacrosse League Hall of Fame in 2007.

The award was created at the end of the 2005 season and, surprisingly, Borrelli was never a recipient.  However, Tom Borrelli was the first sportswriter inducted into the NLL Hall of Fame.

In 2009, The Buffalo News began awarding a lacrosse scholarship and trophy named for Tom Borrelli to the top high school lacrosse player in Western New York. The inaugural Tom Borrelli Memorial Award winner was Jeff Tundo of Orchard Park, who played collegiately at Ohio State and Stony Brook.

Past winners

References

Tom Borrelli
Sportscasting awards
Sports writing awards
American journalism awards
+T
+
Awards established in 2005